The Budapest Demographic Summit is a conference where politicians, church leaders, and other experts talk about demographic issues. It is based in Budapest, Hungary.

First held in 2015, the summit takes place every two years.

Conferences

2019
In 2019, former Australian prime minister Tony Abbott attend the summit with former Liberal cabinet minister Kevin Andrews for an address titled "Demography is Destiny: Families and Future Prosperity". During the summit Abbott talked about immigration.

2021
In 2021, former U.S. vice president Mike Pence, Serbian president Aleksandar Vučić, Bosnian Presidency member Milorad Dodik, Slovenian prime minister Janez Janša and Czech prime minister Andrej Babiš attend the summit.

See also
Danube Institute

References

Political conferences
2015 establishments in Hungary
Anti-immigration politics in Europe
Right-wing populism in Hungary
Right-wing populism in Europe